Charles-Marie-Photius Maurras (20 April 1868 – 16 November 1952) was a French author, politician, poet, and critic. He was an organizer and principal philosopher of Action Française, a political movement that is monarchist, anti-parliamentarist, and counter-revolutionary. Maurras also held anti-communist, anti-masonic, anti-protestant, and anti-Semitic views, though he was highly critical of Nazism, referring to it as "stupidity". His ideas greatly influenced National Catholicism and integral nationalism, with a major tenet of his views being that "a true nationalist places his country above everything".

Raised Catholic, Maurras went deaf and became an agnostic in his youth, but remained anti-secularist and politically supportive of the Church. His ideas were opposed by Pope Pius XI, but received mixed to positive reception from Pope Pius X, Louis Billot, and Pope Pius XII. An Orléanist, he began his career by writing literary criticism and became politically active during the Dreyfus affair. In 1926, Pius XI issued a controversial papal condemnation against Action Française, which was later repealed by Pius XII in 1939.

In 1936, after voicing death threats against Léon Blum, Maurras was sentenced to eight months in La Santé. While imprisoned, he received the support of Mother Agnes of Jesus (the elder sister of Thérèse of Lisieux), Henry Bordeaux, Pius XI, and 40 to 60,000 people. During World War II, Maurras was a supporter of Vichy France, believing that Free France was being manipulated by the Soviet Union. He wrote many anti-Semitic articles during its regime, but was opposed to Vichy's deportation of Jews. He explained his support for Vichy, writing that "As a royalist I never lost sight of the necessity of monarchy. But to invest the royal heir the heritage had to be saved." After its collapse, he was arrested and accused of complicity with the enemy. Following a political trial, he was convicted for incitement to murder, receiving Indignité nationale and a life sentence. In 1951, after falling ill, he was transferred to a hospital and later received a medical pardon. In his final days, he reverted to Catholicism and received the last rites shortly before his death.

A political theorist and a major right-wing intellectual of 20th-century Europe, Maurras significantly influenced right-wing and far-right ideologies, anticipating some of the ideas of fascism. He has been described as the most important French conservative intellectual and has directly influenced a large number of politicians, theorists, and writers on both the left and right, including Eliot, Hulme, Douglas, Evola, Schmitt, Heidegger, Bernanos, Mauriac, Thibon, Sorel, Déon, Laurent, Henri of Orléans, Kuehnelt-Leddihn, Maritain, de Oliveira, Sardinha, Pereyra, Althusser, Osma, Lanz, de Gaulle, Franco, Salazar, Duplessis, Coughlin, Degrelle, Petain, Batista, Perón, Pinochet, Ferrara and Bannon. To this day, Maurras proves to be a highly controversial figure. Critics have attacked Maurras for his anti-Semitic views and support of Vichy, calling him a "fascist icon." Conversely, supporters such as Georges Pompidou have praised him as a prophet. Others, including Emmanuel Macron, have taken a nuanced approach, with Macron stating "I fight all the antisemitic ideas of Maurras, but I find it absurd to say that Maurras must no longer exist."

Biography

Before World War I 

Maurras was born into a Provençal family, brought up by his mother and grandmother in a Catholic and monarchist environment. In his early teens, he became deaf. Like many other French politicians, he was affected greatly by France's defeat in the 1870 Franco-Prussian War. After the 1871 Commune of Paris and the 1879 defeat of Marshal MacMahon's Moral Order government, French society slowly found a consensus for the Republic, symbolized by the rallying of the monarchist Orleanists to the Republic. Maurras published his first article, at the age of 17 years, in the review Annales de philosophie chrétienne. He then collaborated on various reviews, including L'Événement, La Revue bleue, La Gazette de France and La Revue encyclopédique, in which he praised Classicism and attacked Romanticism.

At some point during his youth, Maurras lost his Catholic faith and became an agnostic. In 1887, at the age of seventeen, he came to Paris and began writing literary criticism in the Catholic and Orleanist Observateur. At this time, Maurras was influenced by Orleanism, as well as German philosophy reviewed by Catholic thinker Léon Ollé-Laprune, an influence of Henri Bergson, and by the philosopher Maurice Blondel, one of the inspirations of Christian "modernists", who would later become his greatest opponents. He became acquainted with the Provençal poet Frédéric Mistral in 1888 and shared the federalist thesis of Mistral's Félibrige movement (see Maurras and Félibrige). The same year he met the nationalist writer Maurice Barrès.

In 1890, Maurras approved Cardinal Lavigerie's call for the rallying of Catholics to the Republic, thus making his opposition not to the Republic in itself, but to "sectarian Republicanism".

Beside this Orleanist affiliation, Maurras shared some traits with Bonapartism. In December 1887, he demonstrated to the cry of "Down with the robbers!" during the military decorations trafficking scandal, which had involved Daniel Wilson, the son-in-law of President Jules Grévy. Despite this, he initially opposed the nationalist-populist Boulangist philosophy. But in 1889, after a visit to Maurice Barrès, Barrès voted for the Boulangist candidate; despite his "anti-Semitism of the heart" ("anti-sémitisme de coeur"), he decided to vote for a Jew.

During 1894–1895, Maurras briefly worked for Barrès' newspaper La Cocarde (The Cockade), although he sometimes opposed Barrès' opinions concerning the French Revolution. La Cocarde supported General Boulanger, who had become a threat to the parliamentary Republic in the late 1880s.

During a trip to Athens for the first modern Olympic Games in 1896, Maurras came to criticize the Greek democratic system of the polis, which he considered doomed because of its internal divisions and its openness towards métèques (foreigners).

Political involvement
Maurras became involved in politics at the time of the Dreyfus affair, becoming an Anti-Dreyfusard. He endorsed Colonel Henry's forgery blaming Dreyfus, as he considered that defending Dreyfus weakened the Army and the justice system. According to Maurras, Dreyfus was to be sacrificed on the altar of national interest. But while the Republican nationalist thinker Barrès accused Dreyfus of being guilty because of his Jewishness, Maurras went a step further, vilifying the "Jewish Republic". While Barrès' anti-Semitism originated both in pseudo-scientific racist contemporary theories and Biblical exegesis, Maurras decried "scientific racism" in favor of a more radical "state anti-Semitism."
Maurras assisted with the foundation of the nationalist and anti-Dreyfusard Ligue de la patrie française at the end of 1898, along with Maurice Barrès, the geographer Marcel Dubois, the poet François Coppée and the critic and literature professor Jules Lemaître.

In 1899, Maurras founded the review Action Française (AF), an offshoot of the newspaper created by Maurice Pujo and Henri Vaugeois the year preceding. Maurras quickly became influential in the movement, and converted Pujo and Vaugeois to monarchism, which became the movement's principal cause. With Léon Daudet, he edited the movement's review, La Revue de l'Action Française, which during 1908 became a daily newspaper with the shorter title L'Action Française. The AF mixed integral nationalism with reactionary themes, shifting the nationalist ideology, previously supported by left-wing Republicans, to the political right. It had a wide readership during the implementation of the 1905 law on the separation of Church and State. In 1899 he wrote a short notice in favour of monarchy, "Dictateur et roi" ("Dictator and King"), and then in 1900 his "Enquête sur la monarchie" (Investigations on Monarchy), published in the Legitimist mouthpiece La Gazette de France, which made him famous. Maurras also published thirteen articles in the newspaper Le Figaro during 1901 and 1902, as well as six articles between November 1902 and January 1903 in Edouard Drumont's anti-Semitic newspaper, La Libre Parole.

Between 1905 and 1908, when the Camelots du Roi monarchist league was initiated, Maurras introduced the concept of political activism through extra-parliamentary leagues, theorizing the possibility of a coup d'état. 
Maurras also founded the Ligue d'Action Française in 1905, whose mission was to recruit members for the Action Française.
Members pledged to fight the republican regime and to support restoration of the monarchy under Prince Philippe, Duke of Orléans (1869–1926).

Many early members of the Action Française were practicing Catholics, including Bernard de Vésins, the art historian Louis Dimier and the essayist Léon de Montesquiou. They helped Maurras develop the royalist league's pro-Catholic policies.

From World War I to the end of the 1930s 
Maurras then endorsed France's entry into World War I (even to the extent of supporting the thoroughly republican Georges Clemenceau) against the German Empire. During the war, the Jewish businessman Emile Ullman was forced to resign from the board of directors of the Comptoir d'Escompte bank after Maurras accused him of being a German agent. He then criticized the Treaty of Versailles for not being harsh enough on the Germans and condemned Aristide Briand's policy of cooperation with Germany. In 1923, Germaine Berton carried out the assassination of fellow Action Française member Marius Plateau. Berton had planned to also assassinate Léon Daudet and Maurras but was unsuccessful.

In 1925, he called for the murder of Abraham Schrameck, the Interior Minister of Paul Painlevé's Cartel des Gauches's (left-wing coalition) government, who had ordered the disarming of the far-right leagues. For this death threat, he was sentenced to a fine and a year in jail (suspended). He also voiced death threats against the President of the Council Léon Blum, organizer of the Popular Front, in the Action Française of 15 May 1936, emphasizing his Jewish origins (he once called him an "old semitic camel"). This other death threat earned him eight months in prison, from 29 October 1936 to 6 July 1937. Fearing communism, he joined the pacifists and praised the Munich Agreement of 1938, which the President of the Council Édouard Daladier had signed without any illusions. He also wrote in Action Française:

During the 1930s – especially after the 6 February 1934 crisis—many of Action Française members turned to fascism, including Robert Brasillach, Lucien Rebatet, Abel Bonnard, Paul Chack, and Claude Jeantet. Most of them belonged to the staff of the fascist newspaper Je suis partout (I am everywhere).

Influencing António de Oliveira Salazar's Estado Novo regime in Portugal, Maurras also supported Francisco Franco and, until spring 1939, Benito Mussolini's Fascist regime. Opposing Adolf Hitler because he was anti-German, Maurras himself criticized the racist policies of Nazism in 1936, and requested a complete translation of Mein Kampf – some passages had been censored in the French edition.

After his failure against Charles Jonnart in 1924 to be elected to the Académie française, he succeeded in entering the ranks of the "Immortals" on 9 June 1938, replacing Henri-Robert, winning by 20 votes against 12 to Fernand Gregh. He was received in the Academy on 8 June 1939 by Catholic writer Henry Bordeaux.

Vichy regime, arrest and death 

In June 1940 articles in Action Française signed by Maurras, Léon Daudet, and Maurice Pujo praised General Charles de Gaulle. While Maurras described Marshal Philippe Pétain as a "divine surprise", the statement is usually quoted without context; Maurras was referring specifically to Pétain having political talent as well as being a symbol of France, and there is no evidence of the remark until February 1941.

It is Vichy France's reactionary program of a Révolution Nationale (National Revolution) that was fully approved of by Maurras, who inspired large parts of it. The monarchist newspaper was forbidden in the Occupied Zone and under Vichy censorship in the Southern Zone from November 1942. In La Seule France (1941) Maurras argued for a policy of France d'abord ("France First"), whereby France would restore itself politically and morally under Pétain, resolving the causes in his eyes of France's defeat in 1940, before dealing with the issue of the foreign occupation. This position was contrasted to the attitude of the Gaullists, who fled France and continued the military struggle. Maurras savaged the pre-war French governments for taking an increasingly bellicose position vis-à-vis Germany at precisely the same time that these governments were weakening France, militarily, socially and politically, thereby making France's defeat during 1940 all but inevitable. Maurras also criticized the 1940 Law on the status of Jews for being too moderate. At the same time, he continued to express elements of his longstanding antipathy towards Germany by arguing in La Seule France that Frenchmen must not be drawn to that country's model and by hosting anti-German conferences, and he opposed both the "dissidents" in London and the collaborators in Paris and Vichy (such as Lucien Rebatet, Robert Brasillach, Pierre Laval, or Marcel Déat). In 1943, the Germans planned to arrest Maurras.

A pre-war admirer of de Gaulle, who himself had been influenced by Maurras' integralism, Maurras then harshly criticized the General in exile. He later claimed he believed that Pétain was playing a "double game", working for an Allied victory in secret.

After the liberation of France, Maurras was arrested in September 1944 together with his right-hand man Maurice Pujo, and indicted before the High Court of Lyon for "complicity with the enemy" on the basis of the articles he had published since the beginning of the war. At the end of the trial, during which there were many irregularities such as false dating or truncated quotations, Maurras was sentenced to life imprisonment and deprivation of civil liberties. He was automatically dismissed from the Académie française (a measure included in the ordinance of 26 December 1944). His response to his conviction was to exclaim C'est la revanche de Dreyfus! ("It's Dreyfus's revenge!")

According to historian Eugen Weber, the trial against Maurras was political and was rigged against him. Weber writes that the jurors who were chosen for Maurras' case were taken from a list drawn up by his political enemies.

Meanwhile, the Académie française declared his seat vacant, as it had for Pétain's, instead of expelling him as it did for Abel Hermant and Abel Bonnard. (The academy waited until his death to elect his successor, and chose Antoine de Lévis-Mirepoix, who was himself influenced by Action Française and collaborated with Pierre Boutang's monarchist review La Nation Française.)

After being imprisoned in Riom and then Clairvaux, Maurras was released in March 1952 to be hospitalized. He was supported by Henry Bordeaux, who repeatedly asked the President of the Republic, Vincent Auriol, to pardon Maurras. Although weakened, Maurras collaborated with Aspects de la France, which had replaced the outlawed review Action Française in 1947. He was transferred to a clinic in Tours, where he died soon afterwards. In his last days he readopted the Catholic faith of his childhood and received the last rites.

Maurras' work

Maurras and Félibrige 

A Provence-born author, Maurras joined Félibrige, a literary and cultural association founded by Frédéric Mistral and other Provençal writers to defend and promote Occitan languages and literature. The name of the association was derived from félibre, a Provençal word meaning pupil or follower.

Maurras' political thought 

Maurras' political ideas were based on intense nationalism (what he described as "integral nationalism") and a belief in an ordered society based on strong government. These were the bases of his endorsement for both a French monarchy and the Roman Catholic Church.

He formulated an aggressive political strategy, which contrasted with the Legitimists' apathy for political action. He managed to combine the paradox of a reactionary thought which would actively change history, a form of Counter-revolution opposed to simple conservatism. His "integral nationalism" rejected all democratic principles which he judged contrary to "natural inequality", criticizing all evolution since the 1789 French Revolution, and advocated the return to a hereditary monarchy.

Like many people in Europe at the time, he was haunted by the idea of "decadence", partly inspired by his reading of the publications of Hippolyte Taine and Ernest Renan, and admired classicism. He felt that France had lost its grandeur during the Revolution of 1789, a grandeur inherited from its origins as a province of the Roman Empire and forged by, as he put it, "forty kings who in a thousand years made France." The French Revolution, he wrote in the Observateur Français, was negative and destructive.

He traced this decline further back, to the Enlightenment and the Reformation; he described the source of the evil as "Swiss ideas", a reference to the adopted nation of Calvin and the birth nation of Rousseau. Maurras further blamed France's decline on "Anti-France", which he defined as the "four confederate states of Protestants, Jews, Freemasons and foreigners" (his actual word for the latter being the xenophobic term métèques). Indeed, to him the first three were all "internal foreigners."

Antisemitism and anti-Protestantism were common themes in his writings. He believed that the Reformation, the Enlightenment, and the eventual outcome of the French Revolution had all contributed to individuals valuing themselves more than the nation, with consequent negative effects on the latter, and that democracy and liberalism were only making matters worse.

Although Maurras advocated the revival of monarchy, in many ways Maurras did not typify the French monarchist tradition. His endorsement of the monarchy and for Catholicism was explicitly pragmatic, as he alleged that a state religion was the only way of maintaining public order. By contrast with Maurice Barrès, a theorist of a kind of Romantic nationalism based on the Ego, Maurras claimed to base his opinions on reason rather than on sentiment, loyalty and faith.

Paradoxically, he admired the positivist philosopher Auguste Comte, like many of the Third Republic politicians he detested, with which he opposed German idealism. Whereas the Legitimist monarchists refused to engage in political action, retreating into an intransigently conservative Catholicism and a relative indifference to a modern world they believed was irredeemably wicked and apostate, Maurras was prepared to engage in political action, both orthodox and unorthodox (the Action Française's Camelots du Roi league frequently engaged in street violence with left-wing opponents, as well as Marc Sangnier's socialist Catholic Le Sillon). Maurras was twice convicted of inciting violence against Jewish politicians, and Léon Blum, the first Jewish French prime minister, nearly died from the injuries inflicted by associates of Maurras. His slogan was the phrase "La politique d'abord!" ("Politics first!"). Other influences included Frédéric Le Play, British empiricism, which allowed him to reconcile Cartesian rationalism with empiricism, and René de La Tour du Pin.

Maurras' religious views were likewise less than orthodox. He supported the political Catholic Church both because it was intimately involved with French history and because its hierarchical structure and clerical elite mirrored his image of an ideal society. He considered the Church to be the mortar which held France together, and the association linking all Frenchmen together. However, he distrusted the Gospels, written, as he put it, "by four obscure Jews", but admired the Catholic Church for having allegedly concealed much of the Bible's "dangerous teachings". Maurras' interpretation of the Gospels and his integralist teachings were fiercely criticised by many Catholic clergy. However, towards the end of his life Maurras eventually converted from agnosticism to Catholicism.

Notwithstanding his religious unorthodoxy, Maurras gained a large following among French monarchists and Catholics, including the Assumptionists and the Orleanist pretender to the French throne, the comte de Paris, Philippe. Nonetheless, his agnosticism worried parts of the Catholic hierarchy, and in 1926 Pope Pius XI placed some of Maurras's writings on the Index of Forbidden Books and condemned the Action Française philosophy as a whole. Seven of Maurras' books had already been placed on this list in 1914 and a dossier on Maurras had been submitted to Pius X.

It was not just his agnosticism which worried the Catholic hierarchy but that by insisting upon politiques d'abord he questioned the primacy of the spiritual and thus the teaching authority of the Church and the authority of the Pope himself. That this was the basis of the matter is shown by Jacques Maritain's book Primauté du Spirituel. Maritain was associated with L'Action Française and knew Maurras. While his unease with the movement pre-dates the 1926 crisis, it was this which occasioned his alienation from Maurras and L'Action Française. This papal condemnation was a great surprise to many of his devotees, who included a considerable number of French clergy, and caused great damage to the movement. The papal ban was later ended by Pope Pius XII in 1939, a year after Maurras was elected to the Académie française.

Legacy

Maurras was a major intellectual influence of national Catholicism, far-right movements, Latin conservatism, and integral nationalism. He and the Action Française influenced many people and movements including General Francisco Franco, José Antonio Primo de Rivera, António Sardinha, Leon Degrelle, and autonomist movements in Europe. The Christian Democrat Jacques Maritain was also close to Maurras before the papal condemnation of the AF in 1927, and criticized democracy in one of his early writings, Une opinion sur Charles Maurras ou le devoir des catholiques. Furthermore, Maurrassism also influenced many writings from members of the Organisation armée secrète who theorized "counter-revolutionary warfare". In Spain, the Acción Española adopted not only its far right monarchism but also its name from Maurras's movement.

The influence extended to Latin America, as in Mexico where Jesús Guiza y Acevedo was nicknamed "the little Maurras", as well as the historian Carlos Pereyra or the Venezuelan author Laureano Vallenilla Lanz, who wrote a book titled Cesarismo democrático (Democratic Caesarism). Other figures influenced include the Brazilian Plinio Corrêa de Oliveira. Maurras' thought also influenced Catholic fundamentalist supporters of the Brazilian dictatorship (1964–85) as well as the Cursillos de la Cristiandad (Christendom Courses), similar to the Cité Catholique group, which were initiated during 1950 by the bishop of Ciudad Real, Mgr. Hervé. The Argentine militarist Juan Carlos Onganía, who overthrew Arturo Illia in a military putsch in 1966, as well as Alejandro Agustín Lanusse, who succeeded Onganía after another coup, had participated in the Cursillos de la Cristiandad, as did also the Dominican militarists Antonio Imbert Barrera and Elías Wessin y Wessin, chief of staff of the military and an opponent of the restoration of the 1963 Constitution after Rafael Trujillo was deposed. In Argentina he also influenced the nationalist writers of the 1920s and 1930s such as Rodolfo Irazusta and Juan Carulla.

In 2017, Michael Crowley wrote that Steve Bannon, then chief strategist to President Donald Trump, "has also expressed admiration for the reactionary French philosopher Charles Maurras, according to French media reports confirmed by Politico."

Works 

 English translations
 2016: The Future of the Intelligentsia & For a French Awakening, Arktos Media.

References

Further reading 
 Curtis, Michael (2010). Three Against the Third Republic: Sorel, Barrès and Maurras, Transaction Publishers.
 Kojecky, Roger (1972). "Charles Maurras and the Action Française," in T.S. Eliot's Social Criticism. New York: Farrar, Straus & Giroux, pp. 58–69.
 Molnar, Thomas (1999). "Charles Maurras, Shaper of an Age," Modern Age 41 (4), pp. 337–342.
Serina, Elena (2020). Nuovi elementi sul rapporto fra Action Française e Santa Sede: il ruolo di Louis Dimier nella difesa di Maurras, "Rivista di Storia del Cristianesimo" (2), pp. 497–518.

External links
Maurras.net online library : works of Charles Maurras (in French).
Dreyfus Rehabilitated 
 

1868 births
1952 deaths
French agnostics
People from Martigues
French Roman Catholics
People affiliated with Action Française
Catholicism and far-right politics
Conservatism in France
Far-right politics in France
Politicians of the French Third Republic
Antidreyfusards
Roman Catholic writers
French political writers
Writers from Provence-Alpes-Côte d'Azur
Expelled members of the Académie Française
Order of the Francisque recipients
French collaborators with Nazi Germany
French political philosophers
French anti-communists
People convicted of treason against France
French prisoners and detainees
French male non-fiction writers
Members of the Ligue de la patrie française
Deaf writers
Anti-Masonry
Antisemitism in France
French deaf people
Counter-revolutionaries